Magyar Tudomány is the official monthly science magazine of the Hungarian Academy of Sciences. It publishes short articles on various new scientific developments as well as on problems of scientific life. Most articles are written by members of the academy. It has appeared continuously since 1840, under various names: Académiai Értesítő (1840—1859), Magyar Akadémiai Értesítő (1860—1867), A Magyar Tudományos Akadémia értesítője (1867—1889), Akadémiai Értesítő (1890—1955),  Magyar Tudomány (since 1956). The editor-in-chief is  Vilmos Csányi.

External links
 

Hungarian Academy of Sciences
Hungarian-language magazines
Magazines established in 1840
Monthly magazines
Magazines published in Hungary
Science and technology magazines